Interstate 76 (I-76) is an east–west Interstate Highway in the Western United States that runs from I-70 in Arvada, Colorado – near Denver – to an interchange with I-80 near Big Springs, Nebraska. Along the route, the highway runs concurrent with US Route 6 (US 6), US 85 in the Denver metropolitan area, and US 34 from Wiggins to Fort Morgan. It has no auxiliary Interstates, but it has two business routes that are located in northeastern Colorado. This route is not connected with the other I-76 that spans from Ohio to New Jersey.

Route description

|-
|CO
|
|-
|NE
|
|-
|Total
|
|}

Colorado

I-76 begins at an interchange with I-70 in Arvada. From I-70, the freeway heads east to an exit at State Highway 95 (SH 95), known as Sheridan Boulevard. The route heads northeastward across US 287, known as Federal Boulevard, to an interchange with I-25. Running roughly parallel to nearby Clear Creek, I-76 meets another interchange, with I-270 in North Washington, Colorado, where Clear Creek joins the South Platte River, which is crossed by I-76. After an interchange at SH 224, I-76 joins US 85 and US 6 at Brighton Boulevard. Past Derby, US 85 veers away from I-76 at Dayton Way. The combined routes of US 6 and I-76 head northeastward, crossing SH 2, named Sable Boulevard, before meeting an exit at E-470, a toll road. Past E-470, the freeway exits the Denver metropolitan area.

Passing just west of Barr Lake, the freeway heads northeastward east of Brighton. Near Lochbuie, the freeway crosses SH 7, before crossing into Weld County. I-76 meets SH 52 in Hudson, the next city along the freeway. Past Hudson, the combined routes of US 6 and I-76 turn slightly eastward into Keenesburg, which is served by a business loop (I-76 Business [I-76 Bus]). I-76 then turns northeast and east into Roggen, where it meets County Road 73. The highway heads away from the farmland it was formerly running through and traverses a large grassland area. Just south of the Empire Reservoir, the freeway turns back east, crossing into Morgan County within circular fields. Heading east, I-76 heads into Wiggins, near which I-76 joins US 34. The three combined routes head east through farms.

The freeway heads east toward Fort Morgan, spawning another business loop (I-76 Bus) that carries US 34 away from I-76. The freeway heads east into Fort Morgan, meeting SH 52, now running again near the South Platte River. Still running between the South Platte River to the north and its business loop to the south, I-76 heads just north of Brush, where it meets a cloverleaf interchange with SH 71. US 34 veers away from the business loop as I-76 turns back east, crossing over the business loop, which does not terminate at the freeway. I-76 Bus carries US 6 toward Hillrose. Bypassing that city, I-76 traverses northeast into Washington County, with farms to the north along the river and grasslands to the south. Passing the Prewitt Reservoir, the freeway heads into Logan County. Heading northeasterly, the route crosses SH 63, which serves Atwood. I-76 Bus then enters Sterling, which is near I-76. The business loops turns abruptly east within the city, carrying US 6. US 6 continues past the interchange with the business route.

I-76 continues parallel to the South Platte River, surrounded by farms to the northwest and plains to the southeast. Northwest of the river is US 138, which serves several towns bypassed by the freeway. I-76 has an exit at SH 55 which serves the town of Crook. With farms on the south part of the freeway as well, I-76 enters Sedgwick County, crossing SH 59 which heads to Sedgwick. The freeway then veers eastward before turning back northeast toward Julesburg. I-76 comes to an exit at US 385, which heads northwest to Julesburg. I-76 then heads northeast to the Nebraska state line.

Nebraska

It is signed as a north–south direction as opposed to the east–west designation in Colorado. Its entire route is located in Deuel County, parallel to the South Platte River and US 138. Its only interchange is at I-80, formerly numbered exit 102 based on I-80's mileage, now renumbered as exit 3 based on I-76's mileage.

History

Until 1974, both the segment of I-76 in Colorado and Nebraska and a portion of I-76 in Ohio, Pennsylvania, and New Jersey were signed as Interstate 80S (I-80S). In July 1974, the already-completed route, I-80S, was renumbered to I-76 in accordance with American Association of State Highway and Transportation Officials (AASHTO) policy to remove the letter suffixes from Interstate routes and to avoid the confusion of this route with I-80. This prompted the replacement of around 488 signs in eliminating . The number 76 has an association with 1876, the year Colorado was admitted as a state. Nebraska renumbered its existing Nebraska Highway 76 (N-76) to N-53 as a result.

I-76 was conceived in August 1958. The Colorado portion was planned and built first. In December 1969, the Nebraska Department of Roads (NDOR) worked together with the Colorado Department of Highways to open a  route connecting I-80 with the rest of I-80S in Colorado. The original western terminus of I-76 was at I-25, as planned. The western extension to I-70 was built in the late 1980s and early 1990s. By its completion in November 2002, the total cost was about $45.5 million (equivalent to $ in ).

In 1968, I-25 and US 85 were open to the general traffic to the Denver vicinity after all the structures located throughout the route were completed, as well as meeting the criteria of the Interstate standards. Structures connected several interchanges; each one connecting I-270, US 85, Dahlia Street, Washington Street, 74th Avenue, and York Street. The completion also included structures in which each cross the Burlington Canal, Platte River, and Union Pacific Railroad. By October 24, 1970, the route was open to traffic from Sedgwick to Julesburg, as well as the completion of the route, connecting from its western terminus of I-25 in Colorado to its eastern terminus at I-80 near Big Springs, Nebraska.

Beginning in 1990,  were planned and constructed west of I-25. By October 2002, all of I-76 was open, and the highway reached its current western terminus at I-70 in Arvada.

Exit list

Business routes

Keenesburg

Interstate 76 Business (I-76 Bus) is an unsigned business spur that connects Keenesburg, Colorado, in Weld County to the Interstate. Inventoried by the Colorado Department of Transportation (CDOT), the  route begins at the I-76 frontage road (County Road 398) within the town limits and heads north as Market Street. The route terminates north of I-76 exit 39.

Major intersections

Fort Morgan–Sterling

Interstate 76 Business (I-76 Bus) is a business route of I-76 serving Fort Morgan, Colorado, and adjacent areas to Sterling in Morgan and Logan counties. This  route is the longest continuously signed Interstate business loop in the system. It begins at exit 75 at I-76 west of Fort Morgan. The route overlaps US 34 and SH 52 heading east and becomes W Platte Avenue. After intersecting Sherman Street, SH 52 turns North on Main Street and the route becomes East Platte Avenue, only overlapping US 34. After crossing County Road 21, the route is only assigned as US 34. Entering Brush, the route becomes Edison Street and passes toward the south of town, remaining parallel with the Interstate. Intersecting Colorado Avenue, the route starts overlapping SH 71. SH 71 goes south after the route exits Brush. Then, I-76 Bus comes across a minor Y interchange and US 34 continues east while the business loop proceeds northeast. It interchanges with I-76 again at a partial cloverleaf interchange and starts overlapping US 6. It passes through unincorporated Camden and then enters Hillrose as Railway Street. It remains signed with US 6 after crossing County Road 3305. It remains almost parallel with the Interstate until it approaches the Prewitt Reservoir, where it turns north through Beta and into Merino, becoming Platte Street between Ram Avenue and Logan Avenue. The route continues northeast into Atwood and intersects SH 63, becoming Front Avenue toward 7th Street, remaining concurrent with US 6. The route then enters Sterling, becoming a one-way street between South 3rd Avenue and South Division Avenue, where the route becomes a two-lane road, turns north, and then becomes South 3rd Street. The route turns to the southeast at Chestnut Street and exits town. I-76 Bus meets I-76 and terminates there at a diamond interchange at exit 125, and US 6 continues east past the Interstate.

Major intersections

References

External links

Colorado I-76

Interstate 76
76 west
76
76
Transportation in Colorado
Transportation in Jefferson County, Colorado
Transportation in Adams County, Colorado
Transportation in Weld County, Colorado
Transportation in Morgan County, Colorado
Transportation in Washington County, Colorado
Transportation in Logan County, Colorado
Transportation in Sedgwick County, Colorado
Transportation in Deuel County, Nebraska
Arvada, Colorado
U.S. Route 6
Eastern Plains